Fight Sports is a Grappling and Brazilian jiu-jitsu academy and team based out of Miami, Florida. It was founded in 2011 by multiple time world champion Roberto "Cyborg" Abreu. Fight Sport's competition team includes a number of jiu-jitsu's top competitors, including many ADCC qualifiers. Fight Sports is also an internationally known Jiu Jitsu affiliation with 32 schools worldwide.

History 
Fight Sports started as a Brazilian jiu-jitsu (BJJ) academy established in Miami in 2011 by six-time World No-Gi and ADCC champion Roberto "Cyborg" Abreu, one of the most decorated BJJ competitors in history. In July 2022, there were Fight Sports schools affiliates on four continents and over thirty schools worldwide.

In June 2021 Fight Sports announced partnering with Melqui Galvao's project in Brazil, providing an exchange program between their HQ in Miami and their location in Manaus, Brazil. 18-year-old Mica Galvão announced that he was now representing Fight Sports team going forward in competitions, just like most of the Melqui Galvao-trained athletes. One of the best represented teams heading to the 2022 ADCC World, in June 2022 the team announced having hired wrestler Pat Downey to prepare for the Championship. In January 2023 Melqui Galvao announced leaving Fight Sports to open his own academy in Jundiai, Sao Paulo, Brazil.

In February 2023, three elite competitors: Andre Porfirio, Maggi Grindatti & Luccas Lira Costa announced leaving Fight Sports.

Controversy 
In March 2018 Marcel Goncalves, one of Fight Sports most prominent black belts and head coach of a Fight Sports affiliate in Naples, Florida, was arrested and charged with multiple counts of sexual assault of a minor. The New York Times reported that after he came under fierce criticism, Abreu acknowledged missteps in the way he had responded to sexual abuse allegations in his organization.

Notable members 
A list of current and former members:

 Aaron "Tex" Johnson
 Sofia Amarante
 Fabricio Andrey
 Valdir Araújo
 Daniel Azevedo 
 João Costa
 Roberto "Cyborg" Abreu
 Rodrigo Francioni
 Micael Galvâo
 Marcel Gonçalves
 Maggie Grindatti
 Jacob Mackenzie
 André Porfirio
 Natasha Quiza
 Diogo Reis
 Ricardo Rezende
 Vagner Rocha

References 

2011 establishments in Florida
Brazilian jiu-jitsu organizations
Brazilian jiu-jitsu training facilities
Mixed martial arts training facilities
Organizations based in Miami
Sports organizations established in 2011